Dennis James Lambourne (born 7 October 1945) is a Welsh former professional footballer who played as a forward. He made appearances in the English football league for Wrexham. He also played in the Welsh league for Llanelli and Bangor City.

References

1945 births
Living people
Welsh footballers
Association football forwards
Llanelli Town A.F.C. players
Wrexham A.F.C. players
Bangor City F.C. players
Footballers from Swansea
English Football League players